Ennearthron is a genus of tree-fungus beetles in the family Ciidae.

Species
 Ennearthron abeillei Caillol, 1914
 Ennearthron amamense Miyatake, 1959
 Ennearthron chujoi Nakane & Nobuchi, 1955
 Ennearthron cornutum Gyllenhal, 1827
 Ennearthron filum Abeille de Perrin, 1874
 Ennearthron hayashii Nobuchi, 1955
 Ennearthron ishiharai Miyatake, 1954
 Ennearthron mohrii Miyatake, 1954
 Ennearthron ondreji Roubal, 1919
 Ennearthron palmi Lohse, 1966
 Ennearthron pruinosulum Perris, 1864
 Ennearthron reichei Abeille de Perrin, 1874
 Ennearthron reitteri Flach, 1882
 Ennearthron robusticorne Kawanabe, 1996

References

Ciidae genera